Wet Dreams is a 2002 South Korean film. Inspired partly by American gross-out comedies like American Pie, it follows the sexual misadventures of four boys through middle and high school. While American Pie had been a flop in Korea, Wet Dreams was a surprise box office hit and led to a sequel, Wet Dreams 2.

Production and investments
The company Kangjekyu film originally tried to make the film, aiming for a July release. The film was distributed by company A-Line, which was a distributing company co founded by Samsung venture, KTB entertainment, Egg film, and Kangjekyu film. On April 28, 2002, the casting of actor Lee Beom soo and actress Kim Sun-a was confirmed, with crank in starting around May and an expected filming period of two months, aiming for an August release of the movie. Company HumanCom funded 300 million won out of estimated budget of 1.8 billion won for the film.

References

External links
 
 

2002 films
2000s sex comedy films
2000s Korean-language films
South Korean sex comedy films
2002 comedy films
2000s South Korean films